Dynamic Intelligent Currency Encryption (DICE) is an AI-controlled security technology, which devaluates banknotes and assets remotely that have been stolen or are illegal. The cash security system that is based on identifiable banknotes, was invented and first introduced in 2014 by AI-specialised British-Austrian technology company EDAQS.
The system claims that its MRC or RFID-equipped banknotes and other securities are registered to a centralized and safe system and can be considered as unforgeable, which contributes to solve cash-related problems and helps in the fight against the black economy, crime and terrorism.
One of the main goals of DICE is that the whole banking and retail sector, as well as all entities with regular cash circulation will participate in this passively controlled cash system.
In a second note, the DICE procedure is meant to be an alternative to the abolition of cash by offering all benefits of a cashless economy, while driving down the global crime of violently obtaining cash.
Similar to the IBNS, registered DICE banknotes that have been neutralized, cannot be brought back into circulation and can be directly linked to a crime related issue.

Concept 
The concept relies on the registration of banknotes through connected readers called DICE clouds.
A fast registration of the banknote through the DICE-cloud device, which does not influence the day-to-day business in terms of time delay, offers a full protection of the registered cash assets for the DICE user.
During the registration-procedure, the DICE user will be informed about the legitimacy of the incoming banknote and warned, whether the banknote is part of a crime, is forged or has been degraded for a certain reason.
Once the banknote has been successfully assigned to the user’s account, a robbery but also a destruction of the banknote through other catastrophes, such as a fire or a flood, would result in an executive remote devaluation of the notes. The victim would receive new banknotes.
DICE is also considered as an effective technology to limit the circulation of black money and combat the black economy.

Technology 
The basic process consists of an identifiable banknote, which carries the identification module (Machine Readable Code or microRFID-chip), a blockchain-enabled cloud device, which scans, reads and registers the banknotes as well as a composition of AI-driven automated systems that are based on several sub-systems. 
The mechanism of the systems is based on a proprietary consortium blockchain that provides a centralized registry of banknotes (CEDIRE hyperledger), a digital dye pack system that deactivates or re-activates illegal and degraded banknotes remotely (RENODE) and in the further course the DICE Automated Security Unit, whose task is to monitor the system’s functionality.

RFID-Banknotes 
In addition to MRC-equipped banknotes, DICE also introduced banknotes that use a specifically designed microchip that was developed for high security application and is perfectly suited for paper currencies, as the chip will not be damaged by any harsh handling in daily use as well as during the Intaglio process.
EDAQS claims that the so-called RFIT microchip, which is developed by Australian partner RFIT Limited, is the most secure and robust development in RFID tagging technology to date as well as the smallest On Chip Antenna (OCA) UHF RFID tag in the world. 
With an overall size of only 0.45mm x 0.45mm x 0.2mm, the patented technology places the antenna directly onto the chip silicon.
Every other aspect of the RFIT chip conforms to Electronic Product Code (EPC) Class 1, Gen2 ISO 18000-6C. As both the EPC and Data areas are programmable, the RFIT inlay offers
individualized secure electronic tracking. Requiring a specially designed Near Field Antenna (NFA) to activate the passive UHF RFIT tag, the read range is limited up to 3mm, which in itself provides a security feature when compared to standard RFID tags. As an additional level of security, a normal UHF RFID reader is not able to activate and read the tag.

Reception 
The DICE banknote system would allow central and national banks to supervise and analyze the entire registered cash circulation.
While this is one of the main reasons that have caused the trend for national banks to favor a cashless economy, it is also a serious issue in terms of privacy. 
EDAQS affirmed that the citizen’s privacy rights are not being touched with their system  and that anonymous circulation data would open a wide range of new development models not only for the governments and national banks, but also for economic analyses and stability research.
The public response on the introduction of DICE ranged from a tremendous fear about chip-equipped banknotes to a strong support in improving public safety. 
The Keesing Journal, an opinion leading publication in the document security industry, called DICE-equipped banknotes as the "banknote of the future", despite harsh critics from different political parties, including the German and Austrian Pirates Party.

In another note, the DICE benefits cover and solve almost all cash-related issues that are seen by governments to be a motivation for the progressive abolition of cash.

See also 
Intelligent banknote neutralisation system
Banknote

References 

Security engineering
Crime prevention